The Socialist Republican Party (PRS), whose members were also known as "Saavedristas", was a political party in Bolivia. The Socialist Republican Party emerged on January 28, 1921, as the Republican Party was bifurcated on the same day Bautista Saavedra took office as President of the country. The Socialist Republican Party was formed by Saavedra's followers.

The Republican Socialist Party was formed by a reformist sector. Bautista Saavedra, a populist, represented middle-class and resented the old party's close ties to the powerful tin barons. His appeal to urban middle-class artisans, small merchants, and laborers generated a nonestablishment political base and a new class consciousness. The Republican Government of Bautista Saavedra enacted progressive social and labor codes and doubled government taxes on mining. Though more concerned for the underprivileged classes, Bautista Saavedra blatantly manipulated his populist support.

In the 1925 elections the PRS's presidential candidate was Hernando Siles Reyes. He was elected president and took office on 10 January 1926.

During the rule of Bautista Saavedra and Hernando Siles Reyes, the Bolivian economy underwent a profound change. Tin prices started to decline in the 1920s. After peaking in 1929, tin production declined dramatically as the Great Depression nearly destroyed the international tin market. During the 1920s, Bolivia faced growing social turmoil. Labor unrest, such as the miners' strike in Uncia in 1923, was brutally suppressed. But the unrest reached new heights of violence after the drastic reduction of the work force during the Great Depression. The social legislation of the Republican Socialist Governments was weak. Hernando Siles Reyes's 4 years of inconsistent rule and unfulfilled promises of radical changes frustrated workers and students. In 1930 he was overthrown when he tried to bypass the constitutional provision forbidding reelection by resigning in order to run again. 

Shortly before the Chaco War, the party refounded itself seeking to become a genuine socialist (and less personalistic) party. A fifty-member National Council was formed as the new leading body of the party.

After the Chaco War, the Socialist Republican Party charged the traditional elites with being responsible for the failures of the war. This discourse struck a chord with the radicalized middle class of the country. The party was joined by a number of middle class intellectuals, as well as some trade unionists and Marxists. This development worried the Socialist Party, which charged that Saavedra was not without responsibility for the war nor was he innocent of the killings of miners and peasants in Uncía, Llallagua, Catavi and Jesús de Machaca. However, both parties supported the military government of Colonel David Toro in 1936–1937.

In a bloodless revolution on 17 May 1936, the government of Liberals and Genuine Republicans was overthrown. The coup was led by Colonel Germán Busch Becerra, and he was supported by the Republican Socialist Party. For the 1938 elections, the Republican Socialist Party was the component of the Socialist Single Front.

As a part of the Concordancia-Democratic Alliance formed in March 1939 (along with the Genuine Republican Party and the Liberal Party), the Socialist Republican Party supported the military governments of General Carlos Quintanilla 1939–1940 and General Enrique Peñaranda 1940–1943. In February 1943 the Socialist Republican Party, Socialist Party, Genuine Republican Party and the Liberal Party signed a pact ahead of the upcoming presidential elections.

In 1943 after Gualberto Villarroel’s revolution, the Republican Socialist Party, the Genuine Republican Party, Liberal party and Revolutionary Left Party formed the opposition Antifascist Democratic Front. 

On 10 November 1946, the Republican Socialist Party merged with the Genuine Republican Party, the United Socialist Party and Independent Socialist Party to form the new Republican Socialist Unity Party.

References

Defunct political parties in Bolivia
Political parties established in 1921